Taxi for Tobruk (French: Un taxi pour Tobrouk) is a 1961 war film directed by Denys de La Patellière and starring Charles Aznavour, Lino Ventura and Hardy Krüger. It was made as a co-production between France, Spain and West Germany. The story takes place during World War II in the North African desert at the Battle of El Alamein. Location shooting took place in Almería in Spain. The film's sets were designed by the art director Paul-Louis Boutié.

Cast
 Hardy Krüger as Le capitaine Ludwig von Stegel
 Lino Ventura as 	le brigadier Theo Dumas
 Maurice Biraud as 	François Gensac
 Charles Aznavour as 	Samuel Goldmann
 Germán Cobos as Jean Ramirez
 Ellen Bahl as 	Frau von Stegel 
 Roland Malet as Convict with Ramirez
 Carlos Mendy as German Soldier in Desert with von Stegel 
 Jacques Préboist as Convict with Ramirez 
 Lorenzo Robledo as German Soldier in Desert with von Stegel 
 Dominique Rozan as Parisian on the Champs-Elysées
 Fernando Sancho as 	German Corporal in the Oasis
 Enrique Ávila as German Soldier Playing Cards

References

Bibliography
 Hammer, Tad Bentley. International Film Prizes: An Encyclopedia. Garland, 1991.

External links

1961 films
French adventure films
West German films
1960s French-language films
German war drama films
French war drama films
1961 drama films
Films directed by Denys de La Patellière
North African campaign films
Films with screenplays by Michel Audiard
War adventure films
French World War II films
Films shot in Almería
Gaumont Film Company films
1960s French films
German World War II films
Spanish World War II films
1960s German films